Eusynthemis tenera is a species of dragonfly of the family Synthemistidae,
known as the rainforest tigertail. 
It is a medium-sized dragonfly with black and yellow markings.
It inhabits rainforest streams in north-eastern Australia

Eusynthemis tenera appears similar to Eusynthemis guttata which is found in alpine streams.

Gallery

See also
 List of Odonata species of Australia

References

Synthemistidae
Odonata of Australia
Insects of Australia
Endemic fauna of Australia
Taxa named by Günther Theischinger
Insects described in 1995